Ardbraccan is an ancient place of Christian worship in County Meath, Ireland. It is the location of the former residence of the Roman Catholic, then, after the Reformation, the Church of Ireland Bishop of Meath. It is approximately 30 miles (48 kilometres) from Dublin.

Origins
Ardbraccan originated as a place of Christian worship under St Breacain (also spelt St Braccan  - d.650 AD ) in the 7th century. Its name in the Irish language comes directly from the saint's name: Ard Breacain, meaning the height or Hill of Braccan. On this high point, a monastery and a succession of churches were built, each larger than the last to accommodate the growing number of religious worshippers. The most famous was a large circular church known as the Daimhliag ("stone house"), which was burned to the ground by Viking attackers in the 12th century. Contemporary records say that one thousand people were in the church, seeking protection from the invaders, at the time. According to the historical tract Cogad Gaedel re Gallaib, Ardbraccan was the site of a victory of the Uí Néill over the Vikings sometime in the mid-9th century. Under the name "Hardbrecins", there is a tradition in Durham that this was the birthplace of St Cuthbert, besides other versions linking the Northumbrian bishop and saint to Kells or the Lammermuirs.

King John in Ardbraccan

On 29 June 1210 King John of England, Lord of Ireland and his forces met with Cathal Crobhderg, King of Connacht and his men in Ardbraccan before proceeding north to attack the forces of Hugh de Lacy, 1st Earl of Ulster.

The Diocese of Ardbraccan
The early Irish church possessed many bishoprics or dioceses, each presided over by a bishop. For a period, Ardbraccan itself was a diocese, with a large urban centre attached. Under the Synod of Kells in 1152, Ardbraccan was united with the Sees of Clonard, Trim, Dunshaughlin, Slane and Fore, forming with other small dioceses the Diocese of Meath. Its central importance was shown in the fact that the new merged diocese's bishop lived in Ardbraccan.

From Catholic to Protestant

When, in the aftermath of the crisis over Henry VIII's marriage to Catherine of Aragon, the Irish Church was ordered to formally break its link with the Roman Catholic Church to become the Church of Ireland, the Anglican or Church of Ireland Bishop of Meath continued to live in Ardbraccan in an estate attached to the main church. In this period, Ardbraccan possessed two churches; St. Mary's (which was located in the Bishop's residence) and St. Ultan's, which was named after a local saint who had lived in St. Braccan's day.

New church
In 1777 a new Church of Ireland church was erected on the site of the earlier church of St. Ultan's. The church, built to a design by Rev. Dr. Daniel Augustus Beaufort, remained in use until 1981 when it was deconsecrated due to the dwindling size of the Church of Ireland community in Ardbraccan. Although in 1868 the Ecclesiastical Commissioners of Ireland recorded that there were 267 members of the Church of Ireland living in Ardbraccan parish, by 1968, their number had dwindled to 10 and it ceased to be used for general worship in 1970. The church was finally offered for sale by the Church of Ireland in 2002. Its cemetery is used for burials by both the local Church of Ireland and Roman Catholic parishes.

Bishop's residence for one thousand years
The Church of Ireland Bishop of Meath moved out of the 18th century bishop's palace in 1885 to live in a smaller mansion nearby, Bishopscourt. In 1958, the Church of Ireland bishop moved away from Ardbraccan altogether, with Bishopscourt being bought by a Catholic religious order, the Holy Ghost Fathers, who renamed in An Tobar (Irish for "The Well", linking it to an ancient well at Ardbraccan associated with St. Ultan). When the old church underwent some vandalism, its valuable stained glass windows were removed by the Church of Ireland and donated to An Tobar.

While the Church of Ireland community used the name 'Ardbraccan' to refer to its parish, the nearby Roman Catholic parish in the 19th century opted to use a different name, Bohermeen, from the Irish An Bóthar Mín, meaning 'the smooth road', referring to a famous stretch of road that two thousand years before had passed through the neighbourhood and went to Tara, the occasional home of the High King of Ireland or Ard Rí.

Schools

In 1747 the first Irish Charter School was opened in Ardbraccan. Irish charter schools were operated by The Incorporated Society in Dublin for Promoting English Protestant Schools in Ireland. The Charter Schools admitted only Catholics, under the condition that they be educated as Protestants. These schools were intended, in the words of their programme, "to rescue the souls of thousands of poor children from the dangers of Popish superstition and idolatry, and their bodies from the miseries of idleness and beggary." The Ardbraccan school, like the others, focused on training girls for domestic service in the houses of the gentry and aristocracy, while training boys in agriculture and gardening. As with the other schools, the charter school in Ardbraccan failed and eventually closed down.

Ardbraccan stone

Ardbraccan is also famous for its quarries that supplied cut stone for many Irish and British buildings. The most famous building built with Ardbraccan stone is Leinster House, once the Dublin residence of the Duke of Leinster, Ireland's premier peer, and now the seat of the Irish parliament, Oireachtas Éireann. Ardbraccan limestone was also used on the restoration of The Custom House in Dublin after it was burned down by the IRA in 1921.

Motorway near Ardbraccan
A new motorway will pass near Ardbraccan and the sound of traffic is expected to be audible at the site.

Notable persons
 Alexander de Balscot, Bishop of Meath died here 1400.
 Edmund Oldhall, Bishop of Meath died here 1459.
 George Montgomery, Bishop of Meath, buried here 1621.
 Richard Pococke, English prelate and anthropologist, and briefly Bishop of Meath - buried here 1765.
 John Cowley, actor, died  here 1998.

See also
 Allenstown House
 Ardbraccan House
 Durhamstown Castle
 Saint Ultan of Ardbraccan

References

Further reading
Dean Cogan, The Diocese of Meath (2 Vols, 1862 and 1867)

External links 
 Labyrinth at An Tobar - Ardbraccan

Religious buildings and structures in County Meath